Top Country Albums is a chart that ranks the top-performing country music albums in the United States, published by Billboard.  In 2006, 17 different albums topped the chart, based on electronic point of sale data provided by SoundScan Inc.

The year both began and ended with Carrie Underwood's album Some Hearts at number one.  Underwood had won the fourth season of TV singing competition American Idol in 2005, and Some Hearts, her debut album had reached number one in December of that year.  In the issue of Billboard dated January 7, it spent its fifth week at number one, and occupied the top spot for 11 of the first 13 weeks of the year, its time atop the listing being interrupted for one week by Josh Turner's Your Man and for one week by Alan Jackson's Precious Memories.  In December, shortly after it was named Album of the Year at the 2006 Billboard Music Awards, Some Hearts returned to number one, more than eight months after it had last occupied the top spot, and remained there for the final three weeks of the year.  It was the best-selling album of 2006 in the US, and such was its enduring popularity that it was the biggest-selling country music album of both 2006 and 2007.

Alan Jackson was the only act to achieve more than one number one in 2006; following the single week he spent at number one with Precious Memories in March, he returned to number one in October with Like Red on a Rose.  Three acts reached number one for the first time in 2006: Josh Turner with Your Man in February, Rodney Atkins with If You're Going Through Hell in August and Kellie Pickler, like Carrie Underwood a former American Idol finalist, with Small Town Girl in November.  Johnny Cash, who had died in 2003, had a posthumous number one in July with American V: A Hundred Highways.  It was his first chart-topper since 1971.  The album also reached number one on the all-genre Billboard 200 chart, as did Me and My Gang by Rascal Flatts and Taking the Long Way by the Dixie Chicks.  Despite being the year's biggest-selling album of any genre, Carrie Underwood's Some Hearts could only peak at number two on the Billboard 200.  Me and My Gang spent 13 weeks atop the country listing, the most by any album during 2006.  In November, Alabama, one of the most successful country music acts of the 1980s, ended another lengthy absence from the top of the country albums chart when Songs of Inspiration became the band's first number one since 1989.

Chart history

References

2006
United States Country Albums